Al Jazeera Media Network, endowed by the Government of Qatar, is one of the world's largest news organizations. It provides extensive news coverage through 80 bureaus on a variety of media platforms in several languages, including Arabic and English. Al Jazeera has a large audience, but the organization (particularly its original Arabic channel) has been criticized for its  alleged involvement in controversies ranging from  slanted journalism to anti-Hindu bias and anti-Israel bias.

Allegations of antisemitism and anti-Israel sentiment

Antisemitism 
An article by Sherry Ricchiardi in the American Journalism Review (AJR) noted that critics of Al Jazeera have "assailed what they see as anti-Semitic, anti-American bias in the channel's news content." Ricchiardi had earlier criticized an Al Jazeera report that Jewish employees of 9/11 targets were informed of the attacks beforehand, a report which was also criticized in an October 2001 New York Times editorial. She cited the former Al Jazeera weekly show Sharia and Life, hosted by Yusuf Qaradawi (an Egyptian cleric who "argues clearly and consistently that hatred of Israel and Jews is Islamically sanctioned"). The organization held a 2008 on-air birthday party for Samir Kuntar, a Lebanese terrorist convicted of killing four Israelis who was released in July of that year, later admitting that its coverage of Kuntar's release violated its code of ethics. The organization's Beirut bureau chief said, "Brother Samir, we wish to celebrate your birthday with you" and called him a "pan-Arab hero."

Former Fox News commentator Bill O'Reilly has called Al Jazeera "anti-Semitic" and "anti-American." Dave Marash, a veteran correspondent for ABC's Nightline who resigned from his position as Washington anchor for Al Jazeera English in 2008 due to his perception of anti-American bias there, appeared on The O'Reilly Factor and said: "They certainly aren't anti-Semitic, but they are anti-Netanyahu and anti-Lieberman and anti-Israeli, right ..."

On May 30, 2017, Al Jazeera's English-language account retweeted an Anti-Semitic meme. The network tweeted an apology after the incident, calling it a "mistake."

On May 20, 2019, AJ+ Arabic posted a video which was widely criticized as denying the holocaust.  It was pulled soon thereafter, amid backlash on social media, including from Al Jazeera's own employees.

Israeli–Palestinian conflict
Due to Al Jazeera's position as a major Middle Eastern news outlet, its editorial positions often receive increased scrutiny. During the Second Intifada, Palestinians killed by Israelis were referred to as "martyrs"; Israelis killed by Palestinians were not.

Israel announced a "boycott" of the Arabic broadcaster on 13 March 2008, accusing it of bias in its coverage of the Gaza Strip conflict and toward Hamas. Israeli government employees declined interviews and denied visa applications for the organization's staff. Israeli Deputy Foreign Minister Majalli Wahabi accused it of focusing on Palestinian suffering and ignoring that of Israel: "We have seen that Al-Jazeera has become part of Hamas ... [sic] taking sides and cooperating with people who are enemies of the state of Israel." According to Israeli officials, Al-Jazeera covered the Gaza incursion but not Palestinian rocket attacks against the Israeli city of Ashkelon. Wahabi said that the Israeli Foreign Ministry would send letters of complaint to the organization and the Qatari government. Officials of Palestinian President Mahmoud Abbas' Fatah party has accused Al-Jazeera of bias toward Hamas (with which it is at political loggerheads), and Fatah official Mohammed Dahlan sued the broadcaster. Al-Jazeera agreed to discuss its coverage of Mideast conflict, and the issue has apparently been settled.

In February 2009, Israel again imposed sanctions on Al Jazeera after Qatar closed the Israeli trade office in Doha in protest against the Gaza War. Israel had considered declaring Al Jazeera a hostile entity and shutting its Israeli offices, but after a legal review the Israeli government decided to impose limited measures restricting the organization's activities in the country. All Al Jazeera employees would not have their visas renewed, and the Israeli government would issue no new visas. Al Jazeera staff would not be allowed to attend government briefings; its access to government and military offices was reduced, and it could not interview Knesset members. The organization would only have access to three agencies: representatives of the Prime Minister's Office, the Foreign Ministry, and the IDF Spokesperson's Unit.

On 15 July of that year, the Palestinian National Authority (PA) closed down Al Jazeera's offices in the West Bank in an apparent response to claims made on the channel by Farouk Kaddoumi that PA president Mahmoud Abbas had been involved in the death of Yasser Arafat. The Palestinian Information Ministry called the organization's coverage "unbalanced" and accused it of incitement against the PLO and the PA. Four days later, Abbas rescinded the ban and allowed Al Jazeera to resume operations.

In August 2011, Afghan bureau chief Samer Allawi was arrested by Israeli authorities and charged with being a member of Hamas. Walied Al-Omary, Al Jazeera bureau chief in Israel and the Palestinian territories, said that a military court accused Allawi of making contact with members of Hamas' armed wing. The Committee to Protect Journalists Middle East and North Africa program coordinator Mohamed Abdel Dayem stated that "Israel must clarify why it continues to hold Samer Allawi." Allawi was imprisoned for over a month and fined $1,400 after pleading guilty to meeting with Hamas, a militant group viewed as terrorist by Israel and most of the West. In 2013, UN researcher Nicola Perugini was accused by UN Watch of fabricating a United Nations Human Rights Council session in his Al Jazeera article about the latest UNHRC report on Israeli settlements.

Alleged pro-Qatar bias 
Al Jazeera was founded in 1996 as part of Qatari efforts to turn economic power into political influence in the Arab world and beyond, and continues to receive political and financial backing from the government of Qatar. As a result, Al Jazeera has been criticized for being Qatari state media. In 2010, U.S. State Department internal communications released by WikiLeaks as part of the 2010 diplomatic cables leak said that the Qatari government manipulates Al Jazeera coverage to suit the country's political interests.

Al Jazeera reporters and anchors in London, Paris, Moscow, Beirut and Cairo have resigned. Ali Hashem, the organization's Shia Beirut correspondent, resigned after leaked emails publicized his discontent with Al Jazeera's "unprofessional" and biased coverage of the Syrian civil war at the expense of the 2011 Bahraini uprising. Since the Bahrain government was supported by the Gulf Cooperation Council (of which Qatar is a member), the protests were given less prominence than the Syrian conflict on the network. Longtime Berlin correspondent Aktham Suliman left in late 2012, saying that he felt he was no longer allowed to work as an independent journalist: Before the beginning of the Arab Spring, we were a voice for change, a platform for critics and political activists throughout the region. Now, Al-Jazeera has become a propaganda broadcaster... Al-Jazeera takes a clear position in every country from which it reports—not based on journalistic priorities, but rather on the interests of the Foreign Ministry of Qatar. In order to maintain my integrity as a reporter, I had to quit. 

He added, "The news channel Al Jazeera was committed to the truth. Now it is bent. It's about politics, not journalism. For the reporter that means: time to go ... The decline [in] 2004–2011 was insidious, subliminal, and very slow, but with a disastrous end."

According to Walid Phares, Al Jazeera became the "primary ideological and communication network" for the Muslim Brotherhood during the 2011 Arab Spring in Tunisia, Egypt, Libya, Yemen, and Syria. Phares noted that after democratic forces had begun the rebellions, Al Jazeera played a "tremendous role" in supporting Islamist elements of the revolution.

One of the organization's largest resignations was that of 22 members of Al Jazeera's Egyptian bureau. The group announced their resignation on 8 July 2013, citing biased coverage of Egyptian power redistribution favoring the Muslim Brotherhood. 

During the visit of the Qatari delegation to the 2017 UN General Assembly, anonymous critics commissioned what ostensibly appeared to be a news website, authoring a variety of articles calling Al Jazeera a "state-run propaganda arm", criticizing the Gulf state's link to terror groups or to Iran, and promoting a dark view of the Qatari economy in response to the diplomatic crisis that year. The organization commissioned to launch this website was later identified as a conservative-leaning PR firm, Definers Public Affairs, which was also hired by Facebook to attack the social network's opponents, including Apple, Google, and the philanthropist George Soros.

Islamist position
Since Al Jazeera's founding in 1996, its Islamist skew grew stronger and damaged Qatar’s political relations with its neighboring states of Saudi Arabia and Egypt. According to Hugh Miles writing for the BBC, "Al-Jazeera network remains the standard bearer for the Islamist position."

Satellite disruption
During the 2010 FIFA World Cup opening game, Al Jazeera Sports' transmission to the Arab world went down without explanation in the first half; second-half transmission was patchy. Al Jazeera and FIFA said that they were working to figure out the cause of the disruption of Al Jazeera's broadcast rights. According to a report in The Guardian, evidence indicated jamming by the Jordanian government.

2018 cricket pitch fixing exposé 

The organization was instrumental in exposing pitch-fixing and -tampering controversies in Sri Lanka and India by covering pitch-fixing, primarily at Sri Lanka's Galle International Stadium. The Al Jazeera documentary Cricket's Match-Fixers revealed secret plans to fix the first match, scheduled at Galle during the November 2018 test series between England and Sri Lanka.

According to Al Jazeera's Investigative Unit, the groundsman at Galle helped bookmakers fix test matches at the stadium by changing the condition of the pitch. Al Jazeera reported that the last two test matches (Sri Lanka v Australia in 2016 and India v Sri Lanka in 2017) played at Galle were fixed by bookmakers who were seen bribing the groundsman at Galle. The report said that the bookmakers identified as suspects, including former Indian professional domestic cricketer Robin Morris, former Pakistani domestic cricketer Hasan Raza and former Sri Lankan cricketer Tharindu Mendis, were filmed secretly by an Al Jazeera reporter in the United Arab Emirates as they discussed past and future match-fixing.

By country

Algeria
Several Algerian cities lost power on 27 January 1999, reportedly to keep residents from watching a program in which Algerian dissidents implicated the Algerian military in a series of massacres. On 4 July 2004, the Algerian government froze the activities of Al Jazeera's Algerian correspondent. The official reason was that a reorganization of the work of foreign correspondents was in progress. According to Reporters Without Borders, however, the measure was a reprisal for a broadcast the previous week of another Al-Itijah al-Mouakiss debate on the political situation in Algeria.

Bangladesh
In 2012, Al Jazeera faced criticism from Bangladeshi human rights activists and relatives of those killed in the 1971 Bangladesh Liberation War. The news channel is often accused of downplaying the 1971 Bangladesh genocide, in which Islamist militias assisted the Pakistan Army in targeting Bengalis who sought independence from Pakistan. 

In response to the Al Jazeera Investigates documentary All the Prime Minister's Men, the Government of Bangladesh described it as "a misleading series of innuendos and insinuations in what is apparently a politically motivated “smear campaign” by notorious individuals associated with the Jamaat-i-Islami extremist group, which has been opposing the progressive and secular principles of the People’s Republic of Bangladesh since its very birth as an independent nation in 1971". The foreign ministry stated that the Bangladeshi government "regrets that Al Jazeera has allowed itself to become an instrument for their malicious political designs aimed at destabilizing the secular democratic Government of Bangladesh with a proven track record of extraordinary socio-economic development and progress". The ministry also stated that "the fact that the report’s historical account fails to even mention the horrific genocide in 1971 in which Jamaat perpetrators killed millions of Bengali civilians" was "one reflection of the political bias in Al Jazeera’s coverage". The Bangladesh Army called the documentary a "concocted and ill-intended report by a vested group in the news channel Al-Jazeera", according to a statement by ISPR. 

Responding to allegations by Al Jazeera that Israeli surveillance equipment is used by Bangladesh UN Peacekeeping Forces, United Nations spokesman Stéphane Dujarric said that UN agreements with Bangladesh on peacekeeping deployments did not include the "operation of electronic equipment in the nature described by Al Jazeera in its documentary, and such equipment has not been deployed with Bangladeshi contingents in UN peacekeeping operations". The UN called for an investigation into allegations of corruption among senior Bangladeshi officials.

The Bangladesh Federal Union of Journalists demanded a ban on Al Jazeera transmission within Bangladesh citing similar bans in Saudi Arabia, Bahrain, Egypt, Jordan and the UAE.

Lamenting the censorship of Bangladeshi media, Mahfuz Anam, editor of The Daily Star, wrote "Besides the government, the Al Jazeera report has also put us, the Bangladeshi media, on the dock, which is the main focus of my piece. Thousands of our readers want to know how come we are publishing the government and military's condemnation of Al Jazeera without ever telling our readers what Al Jazeera said or reported. A normal journalistic practice, and one that we follow at The Daily Star, is that unless we carry the original story, in this case the Al Jazeera report, we do not publish any rejoinder, in this case the condemnatory statements of our foreign office and the military. They want to know, what prevented us from carrying the said report in the first place? If we were a free media today, we would have delved deeper into the widely-talked-about Al Jazeera report and analysed it, point by point, and exposed it for what it really is — not a top-class work of investigative journalism".

Bahrain
Bahrain Information Minister Nabeel bin Yaqub Al-Hamar banned Al Jazeera correspondents from reporting from inside the country on 10 May 2002, saying that the station was biased towards Israel and against Bahrain. After improvements in relations between Bahrain and Qatar in 2004, Al Jazeera correspondents returned to Bahrain. In 2010, however, the Information Ministry again banned Al Jazeera correspondents from reporting inside the country. The ministry accused the network of "flouting [Bahrain's] laws regulating the press and publishing" after Al Jazeera aired a report on poverty in Bahrain.

During his visit to Egypt in November 2011, Bahrain Centre for Human Rights president Nabeel Rajab criticized Al Jazeera's coverage of the 2011 protests and said that it represents an Arabic double standard. Rajab said, "Al Jazeera's intentional ignoring  ... coverage of Bahrain protests makes me strongly believe that we need channels that are sponsored by people rather than by regimes." In the run-up to the Qatar diplomatic crisis, Bahrain blocked Al Jazeera within its borders.

Egypt

Al Jazeera has faced considerable criticism and backlash in Egypt and other Arab countries; from ordinary people, media outlets, and governments who accuse it of supporting Qatari agenda and Islamists such as the Muslim Brotherhood Al Jazeera has been criticized by an Egyptian newspaper for its allegedly-biased coverage of news related to Egypt and its government. According to the Egypt Independent, many Egyptians believe Al Jazeera’s attacks to be a concerted effort by the channel to destroy Egypt’s image in the region."

In 2010, Al Jazeera filed a lawsuit against the Egyptian Al-Ahram newspaper for "Jazeerat al-Taharoush" ("Al Jazeera: An Island of Harassment"), a 9 June 2010 article which Al Jazeera found "wholly deceptive and journalistically unprofessional" with an aim to "damage the reputation of the Al Jazeera Network." The Egyptian regime later collapsed as a result of the Arab Spring.

A Cairo court ordered Al Jazeera to stop broadcasting in Egypt in September 2013, saying that it was "inciting violence that led to the deaths of Egyptians." On December 29 of that year, three journalists working for Al Jazeera English (Australian Peter Greste, Egyptian-Canadian Mohamed Fahmy and Egyptian Baher Mohammed) were taken into custody by Egyptian security forces at the Cairo Marriott Hotel. On June 23, 2014, after a four-month trial, they were found guilty of spreading false news and collaborating with the Muslim Brotherhood and sentenced to seven to 10 years' imprisonment. They were released on bail shortly afterwards, and Mohamed Fahmy sued Al Jazeera on 5 May 2015 for 100 million (83m; £53m) in punitive and remedial damages for negligence and breach of contract. He accused the network of "negligence" by misinforming him about its legal status and their safety in Egypt. The three were pardoned on September 23, 2015, and released. Egypt blocked 21 websites, including Al-Jazeera and Masr AlArabiya, in May 2017, for allegedly supporting terrorism and spreading fake news by supporting the outlawed Muslim Brotherhood.

In 2021, Egyptian media criticized Al Jazeera for refusing to cover the protests against a controversial electoral law in Qatar which limited the voting rights of a Bedouin tribe. According to Ikram Badr al-Din, a professor of political science at Cairo University, this "suggests that it is not independent and works only for the benefit of the ruling family in Qatar.”

India
Columnist Seema Sirohi has accused Al Jazeera of spreading an ignorant anti-India narrative in its coverage of the country. The Indian government banned the Al Jazeera TV channel in April 2015 for five days for repeatedly broadcasting disputed maps of India. According to the Surveyor General (SGI) had observed that in some of the maps displayed by Al Jazeera, "a portion of the Indian territory of Jammu and Kashmir (i.e. PoK and Aksai Chin) has not been shown as a part of Indian territory" on some Al Jazeera maps; Lakshadweep and the Andaman Islands were also not shown as Indian territories on some of the maps. In its reply to an order to show cause, Al Jazeera said that all its maps are generated by internationally known software used by Global News Providers. In a separate statement, Al Jazeera said that it was penalised for a legacy issue since it had abided by the Indian guidelines since 2014.

Iraq
During the Iraq War, Al Jazeera and other news-gathering organizations experienced reporting and movement restrictions. Reporter Tayseer Allouni was expelled from the country and Diyar Al-Omari, another reporter, was stripped of his journalistic credentials by the US. On 2 April 2003, the organization announced that it would "temporarily freeze all coverage" of Iraq in protest of what Al Jazeera called unreasonable interference by Iraqi officials. Contrary to allegations, including those by Donald Rumsfeld on 4 June 2005, Al Jazeera has never shown beheadings; beheadings have appeared on a number of other websites, and have sometimes been misattributed to the organization. When the allegations were reported in other media, Al Jazeera pressed for retractions; The Guardian later corrected its report that the organization "had shown videos of masked terrorists beheading western hostages". The allegation was repeated on Fox News, however, when Al Jazeera's English service was launched on 15 November 2006.

The Iraqi Allawi government closed Al Jazeera's Iraq office on 7 August 2004, calling the network responsible for a negative image of Iraq and charging it with fueling anti-Coalition hostilities. Al Jazeera spokesman Jihad Ballout said, "It's regrettable and we believe it's not justifiable. This latest decision runs contrary to all the promises made by Iraqi authorities concerning freedom of expression and freedom of the press," and Al Jazeera vowed to continue reporting from inside Iraq. Photographs showed United States and Iraqi military personnel closing the office. The initial one-month shutdown was extended indefinitely in September 2004 and the offices were sealed, drawing condemnation from international journalists.

In April 2013, Iraq banned Al Jazeera and nine other TV channels for "sectarian bias". In a statement, the Iraqi Communication and Media Commission said that the satellite channels had "exaggerated things, given misinformation and called for breaking the law and attacking Iraqi security forces". The commission noted a "sectarian tone" in the TV coverage and "undisciplined media messages exceeded all reasonable limits", threatening to "jeopardize the democratic process".

Israel
Al Jazeera TV covered welcome-home festivities for Samir Kuntar, a Lebanese terrorist imprisoned in Israel for killing several people in a Palestine Liberation Front raid from Lebanon into that country, on 19 July 2008. On the program, Al Jazeera Beirut office head Ghassan bin Jiddo called Kuntar a "pan-Arab hero" and organized a birthday party for him. Israel's Government Press Office (GPO) announced a boycott of the channel, including a refusal by Israeli officials to be interviewed and a ban of its correspondents entering government offices in Jerusalem. Several days later, Al Jazeera director-general Wadah Khanfar issued a letter admitting that the program violated the channel's code of ethics and saying that he ordered its programming director to take steps to ensure that such an incident would not recur.

The channel was also criticized for allegedly-biased coverage of events in the Israeli–Palestinian conflict, including the 2002 Bat Mitzvah massacre where the network omitted the facts that the victims were attending a bat mitzvah at a crowded banquet hall. When Palestinian militant Raed Karmi was killed by the Israeli Army, Al Jazeera was criticized for failing to provide sufficient context in its story.

Israel again accused Al Jazeera of bias in 2008. Deputy Foreign Minister Majalli Wahabi accused the organization of focusing on Palestinian suffering and downplaying that of Israel, referring to Israeli residents of the western Negev who had been the target of rocket attacks from the Gaza Strip. "We have seen that Al-Jazeera has become part of Hamas ... taking sides and cooperating with people who are enemies of the state of Israel," said Wahabi, a Druze. "The moment a station like Al-Jazeera gives unreliable reports, represents only one side, and doesn't present the positions of the other side, why should we cooperate?" According to Israeli officials, Al Jazeera covered the Gaza incursion but not Palestinian rocket attacks on the Israeli city of Ashkelon. Wahabi said that the Israeli Foreign Ministry would send letters of complaint to the government of Qatar and Al Jazeera. 

In February 2015, Al Jazeera posted an article on its online edition alleging that the Israeli government had opened dams in its southern region to intentionally flood parts of the Gaza Strip. The article was replaced on 25 February with a statement that there were no dams in southern Israel and the original article was false. During the June 2017 Jerusalem attack, Israeli media accused Al-Jazeera of not identifying it as a terrorist attack and ignoring an attack by three Palestinians on the Temple Mount in Old Jerusalem (focusing instead on the killing of a Palestinian by Israeli forces during Friday prayers).

Kuwait
The Al Jazeera office in Kuwait City was closed by government officials after the organization aired a story on police crackdowns. The story included interviews with members of the Kuwaiti opposition and a video of police beating activists. Four National Assembly members were injured in the crackdown. Kuwait's Minister of Information described Al Jazeera's coverage as "intervention in a Kuwaiti domestic issue."

Libya
According to Libyan media, Al Jazeera worked on behalf of the Western world and the Gulf Cooperation Council to promote anti-Libyan policies and "disseminate falsehoods and lies to incite international public opinion."
The Emir of Qatar Hamad bin Khalifa Al Thani opposed the government of Libya and supported the 2011 Libyan Civil War. The emir ordered Al Jazeera to emphasize the Libyan conflict, contributing to the insurgency's spread and influencing the Arab world's view of Libya. Within a week of the start of the rebellion, Al Jazeera began using the rebels' tricolor flag to identify its coverage.

The emir appeared on Al Jazeera, saying that military intervention in Libya was necessary, and the organization's journalists were criticized for not challenging his position. The organization reported that Muammar Gaddafi was ordering troops to use rape as a weapon of war and issuing Viagra to his troops. Amnesty International investigated the claims and found them groundless.

Malaysia
Al Jazeera aired Locked Up in Malaysia's Lockdown, a 101 East documentary alleging that the government of Malaysia mistreated illegal migrants and foreign workers during the country's COVID-19 lockdown, on 3 July 2020. The documentary was called "misleading" and "inaccurate" by the Malaysian government; Senior Minister Ismail Sabri Yaakob demanded an apology from the organization for "false reporting." The Royal Malaysia Police began an investigation of the documentary, and the Immigration Department sought to question the Al Jazeera journalists and a Bangladeshi migrant whom they interviewed. Several non-governmental organizations, including the Centre for Investigative Journalism (CIJ), issued a statement defending Al Jazeera and calling on the Malaysian government to end its "intimidatory measures" against Al Jazeera and migrant workers.

On 4 August, a team of Malaysian police officers and personnel from the Malaysian Communications and Multimedia Commission raided Al Jazeera's office near the Petronas Towers and seized several devices as part of their investigation of the documentary. Al Jazeera English managing director Giles Trendle condemned the raid as a "crackdown on media freedom", and called on Malaysian authorities to end the criminal investigation of its journalists.

Saudi Arabia

Saudi Arabia banned Al-Jazeera and another Qatari website in early 2017 after Qatari Emir Tamim bin Hamad Al Thani said that he recognized Iran as an Islamic regional power and criticized Saudi Arabia and Donald Trump's policy toward Iran. He praised the Lebanese organization Hezbollah and the Palestinian group Hamas. Qatar denied the allegations, saying that its QNA website had been hacked and it was investigating the incident.

Somalia
Al Jazeera aired The Toxic Truth, a two-part documentary on toxic waste dumped in Somalia, in January 2009. A Somali journalist who studied the documentary concluded that the organization failed to rigorously research the story. Another criticism of the documentary was that Al Jazeera did not allow former Somali interim president Ali Mahdi Muhammad to exercise his right of reply to accusations that he authorized Italy-based companies to dump in Somalia.

Spain
Reporter Tayseer Allouni was arrested in Spain on 5 September 2003 and charged with providing support to members of al-Qaeda. Judge Baltasar Garzón, who issued the arrest warrant, ordered Allouni held without bail. Al Jazeera wrote to Spanish Prime Minister Jose Maria Aznar in protest: "On several occasions, Western journalists met secretly with secret organizations and they were not subjected to any legal action because they were doing their job, so why is Allouni being excluded?" Allouni was later released on bail for health reasons, but was prohibited from leaving the country.

On 19 September, a Spanish court issued an arrest warrant for Allouni before the expected verdict. Allouni had asked the court for permission to attend his mother's funeral in Syria, but authorities denied his request and ordered him back to jail.

After pleading not guilty, Allouni was sentenced on 26 September 2005 to seven years in prison for being a financial courier for al-Qaeda. Allouni insisted that he merely interviewed Osama bin Laden after the 11 September 2001 attack on the United States. Al Jazeera has supported Allouni, insisting that he is innocent.

Reporters Without Borders) condemned Allouni's rearrest, and called on the Spanish court to free him. In January 2012, The European Court of Human Rights ruled on 17 January 2012 that the Spanish sentence was illegal, and Allouni was freed in March.

Sudan
In May 2019, Sudan closed Al Jazeera's office. Sudan summoned its envoy in Qatar for consultation the following month, saying that the envoy would soon return to Qatar. Qatar was seen as a close ally of ousted Sudanese president Omar al-Bashir.

Syria
Al Jazeera has been criticized for its coverage of the Syrian civil war, largely supporting the rebels and demonizing the Syrian government. The Lebanese newspaper As-Safir cited outtakes of interviews in which the channel's staff coached Syrian eyewitnesses and fabricated reports of government oppression and leaked internal emails suggesting that the organization has become a tool of the Qatari emir's foreign policy supporting Syria's rebels and advocating military intervention in the country.

Ahmad Ibrahim, in charge of Al Jazeera's coverage of Syria, is the brother of a leading member of the rebel Syrian National Council. Al Jazeera reportedly pressured its journalists to use the term "martyr" for slain Syrian rebels, but not pro-government forces.

A former Al Jazeera news editor from Syria who had worked at the organization for "nearly a decade" was fired without cause in January 2013. In an interview, they said that it was linked to their resistance to pressure to provide biased coverage of the civil war. The According to the editor, the Muslim Brotherhood was "controlling the Syrian file at Al-Jazeera"; both organizations slanted news coverage in favor of the Brotherhood ousting the Syrian government by force, and warned the then-editor that "the majority [in Syria] is with the Muslim Brotherhood and [taking power] is within our grasp ... thank your god if you get a pardon when we become the government." The source named several other employees who resigned in protest, including Berlin bureau director Aktham Sleiman (a Syrian "who was, in the beginning, with the [Syrian] opposition" but resisted what the editor called the "lies and despicable [political and ethnic] sectarianism"). "Al-Jazeera has lied and is still lying" about Syria, favoring armed insurrection and the Muslim Brotherhood.

Tunisia
In midst the COVID-19 pandemic in 2021, Al Jazeera retracted an article which accused Tunisia of "internalised Islamophobia" for closing the country’s mosques to prevent the spread of the coronavirus disease 2019.

Ukraine 
During the 2022 Russian invasion of Ukraine, Al Jazeera English said of the Ukrainian refugees that "These are not, obviously, refugees trying to get away from areas in the Middle East that are still in a big state of war" and that "They look like any European family that you would live next door to." The network later issued an apology for these remarks, calling them "insensitive and irresponsible".

United Arab Emirates
In 2015, Al Jazeera was condemned by UAE Minister of Foreign Affairs Anwar Gargash for twisting a statement by UAE Foreign Minister Abdullah bin Zayed Al Nahyan about the Russian Sukhoi Su-24 downed by Turkey. During a press conference with a Russian official in Abu Dhabi, Al Nahyan said that the UAE "offers its deepest condolences to our Russian friends on the incident of the military plane that crashed recently in Syria" and called the crash of a Russian civilian plane in Egypt "a terrorist act." Al Jazeera reported that he "describes the Turkish shooting of the Russian fight jet a terrorist act," which Gargash said ignored the fact that he was referring to the Russian passenger plane which crashed in Egypt. The Al Jazeera statement was reported more than once, and was tweeted by the channel on its main Twitter account. According to Gargash, "The way Al Jazeera channel has dealt with the statement of Shaikh Abdullah Bin Zayed was not a professional blunder; It was part of a smear campaign [by the media] against the UAE."

The UAE blocked Al Jazeera in the emirates on 5 June 2017 (after the onset of the Qatar diplomatic crisis) because the organization was a state-endowed entity of the Qatari government and Qatar is "a major sponsor of hate speech through Al Jazeera’s Arabic-language network and its other state-controlled media entities." In the International Court of Justice case filed by Qatar against the United Arab Emirates about the elimination of all forms of racial discrimination (Qatar v. United Arab Emirates), Qatar requested that the court order the UAE to suspend its block of Al Jazeera. The court ruled, "both parties shall refrain from any action which might aggravate or extend the dispute
before the court or make it more difficult to resolve."

In June 2017, hacked emails from UAE ambassador to the US Yousef Al Otaiba were reported as "embarrassing" by HuffPost because they indicated links between the UAE and the US-based Foundation for Defense of Democracies. According to a number of observers, the extensive media coverage of the alleged email hack was seen as exacerbatiing the Qatar diplomatic crisis and orchestrated by Qatar.

After the 2017 Qatar diplomatic crisis and in 2018, Al Jazeera reported apparent new details about a 1996 Qatari coup d'état attempt which accused the UAE, Saudi Arabia, Bahrain, and Egypt of plotting to overthrow Hamad bin Khalifa Al Thani. According to the organization, former French National Gendarmerie commander Paul Barril was contracted and supplied with weapons by the UAE to carry out the coup in Qatar. UAE Minister of Foreign Affairs Anwar Gargash said that Barril was a security guard for Qatari emir Khalifa bin Hamad Al Thani during the emir's visit to Abu Dhabi; had no connection to the UAE, and the report was an attempt to involve the UAE in the coup attempt.

In 2019, Al Jazeera Arabic tweeted that a photograph of a Buddhist sculpture in Abu Dhabi which was part of a Louvre Abu Dhabi cultural initiative led to "commentators saying there is a return of idol worship to the Arabian Peninsula." The National called the insinuation that the sculpture contradicted Islam fake news.

United Kingdom
UK officials, like their US counterparts, protested against Al Jazeera's coverage of the 2003 invasion of Iraq. According to the organization, coalition leaders objected because its reporting made it more difficult for both countries to manage the reporting of the war.

Several pro-Israel British activists and a former Israeli embassy employee filed complaints with UK media regulator Ofcom in 2017 that The Lobby, an Al Jazeera four-part documentary series, was antisemitic. The complaints also accused the organization of bias, unfair editing, and infringement of privacy, because The Lobby used hidden cameras and undercover journalism to investigate alleged efforts by Israeli diplomats and UK pro-Israel advocacy groups to influence British foreign policy to favor Israel. On 9 October 2017, Ofcom issued a 60-page ruling rejecting the complaints which was welcomed by an Al Jazeera source as vindicating the organization's journalism.

United States
Since the September 11 attacks, US officials have accused Al Jazeera's news coverage of anti-American bias. The organization first received widespread attention in the West after 9/11, when it broadcast videos in which Osama bin Laden and Sulaiman Abu Ghaith defended the attacks. This led to accusations by the United States government that Al Jazeera was broadcasting propaganda on behalf of terrorists. The organization countered that it was making information available without comment, and several Western television channels later broadcast portions of the tapes. At a 3 October 2001 press conference, Colin Powell tried to persuade the emir of Qatar to close Al Jazeera.

On 13 November 2001, during the war in Afghanistan, a US missile destroyed Al Jazeera's office in Kabul. There were no casualties.
When Al Jazeera reported events with graphic footage from inside Iraq, the organization was described as anti-American and inciting violence because it reported on issues of national security. In 2003, Washington bureau chief Hafez al-Mirazi resigned to protest the organization's "Islamist drift."

On 24 March 2003, two Al Jazeera reporters covering the New York Stock Exchange (NYSE) had their credentials revoked. The NYSE banned Al Jazeera and several other undisclosed news organizations from its trading floor indefinitely. According to NYSE spokesman Ray Pellechia, the ban was for "security reasons" and the exchange had decided to allow access only to networks focusing "on responsible business coverage". Pellechia denied that the revocation of credentials was connected to Al Jazeera's Iraq War coverage. However, NYSE executive vice president for communications Robert Zito indicated that Al Jazeera's 22 March 2003 broadcast of US POWs and dead American soldiers led him to ban the organization. The move was quickly mirrored by NASDAQ stock-market officials. The NYSE ban was lifted several months later. Akamai Technologies, a US company whose founder was killed in the 11 September World Trade Center attacks, canceled a contract to provide web services for Al Jazeera's English-language website.

On 12 October 2008, Al Jazeera broadcast interviews with attendees of a Sarah Palin rally in St. Clairsville, Ohio. The interviewees made racist remarks about Barack Obama, such as "he regards white people as trash" and "I'm afraid if he wins, the blacks will take over". The report received over 2 million views on YouTube and, according to Colin Powell, "Those kind of images going out on Al Jazeera are killing us." The Washington Post then ran an op-ed saying that Al Jazeera was deliberately encouraging "anti-American sentiment overseas". The organization called the column "a gratuitous and uninformed shot at Al Jazeera's motives", and its report was only one of "hundreds of hours of diverse coverage."

Al Jazeera has reportedly censored criticism of the United States in response to US pressure. Al Jazeera English director Wadah Khanfar resigned in September 2011 after WikiLeaks documents asserted that he had close ties to the US and agreed to remove content if Washington objected.

In 2014, Al Jazeera retracted an article which claimed that the murders of two US journalists (James Foley and Steven Sotloff) by Islamic State were staged by the US as an excuse for attacking ISIS.

On 28 April 2015, Al Jazeera America supervisor of media and archive management Matthew Luke filed a US$15 million lawsuit against the organization for unfair dismissal. Luke alleged that he had been unfairly dismissed after he had raised concerns with Al Jazeera's human-resource division that senior vice-president of broadcast operations and technology Osman Mahmud (his boss) discriminated against female employees and made antisemitic remarks. Al Jazeera America head Ehab Al Shihabi announced that the organization would contest the lawsuit in court. Mahmud denied Luke's charges, calling him a difficult employee. In an unrelated development, two female Al Jazeera America employees (executive vice-president for human resources Diana Lee and executive vice-president for communications Dawn Bridges) had resigned that week. On 4 May, senior Al Jazeera America executive and former CBS news anchor Marcy McGinnis resigned from the organization for undisclosed reasons. The following day, Al Jazeera Media Network demoted Al Shihabi from CEO to chief operations officer (COO) of Al Jazeera America after The New York Times reported that he had attempted to fire and sue popular host Ali Velshi. Shihabi was replaced by former Al Jazeera English managing director Al Anstey. Anstey announced on 13 January 2016 that Al Jazeera America would cease operations in April; the "decision by Al Jazeera America’s board is driven by the fact that our business model is simply not sustainable in light of the economic challenges in the U.S. media marketplace".

Death of Tareq Ayyoub

Al Jazeera's Baghdad office was hit by a missile fired by an American ground-attack aircraft on 8 April 2003, killing reporter Tareq Ayyoub and wounding another person. Al Jazeera reported that it had mailed the coordinates of its office to the US State Department six weeks earlier. Dima Tareq Tahboub, Ayyoub's widow, denounced her husband's death; she has written for The Guardian and participated in an Al Jazeera English documentary. The New York Times reported on 30 January 2005 that the Qatari government, under pressure from the Bush administration, was planning to sell Al Jazeera.

Death of Shireen Abu Akleh

Shireen Abu Akleh was associated with Al Jazeera since 2000, the beginning of second Palestinian Intifada. In May 2022, she was in West Bank to cover the Israeli raids in Jenin. On 11 May, Abu Akleh was shot in the head during crossfire between Israeli forces and Palestinian militants. The Israeli military has admitted that there is a high probability of taking the shot "by mistake". She was taken to the hospital in a critical condition and was shortly pronounced dead. Al Jazeera claimed that it was a deliberate act of targeting and killing their journalist by the Israeli forces. Israeli Defence Forces said the firing was from two sides, Israeli forces and Palestinian suspects of “terrorist activities”. They also said that it was being investigated if Abu Akleh was possibly hit by Palestinian gunfire. However, Al Jazeera disagreed saying there was no shooting by Palestinian gunmen.

Bombing memo

The UK tabloid Daily Mirror reported on 22 November 2005 that it had obtained a leaked memo from 10 Downing Street that US President George W. Bush had considered bombing Al Jazeera's Doha headquarters in April 2004, when United States Marines were conducting a contentious assault on Fallujah.

Omar Abdel-Rahman

Oren Kessler accused Al Jazeera of defending Omar Abdel-Rahman for the 1993 World Trade Center bombing. Arabs and Westerners received differing messages from news organizations in the Gulf states. Al Jazeera reportedly praised Abdel-Rahman, saying that he "defended human rights" and "rejected tyranny".

Detention of Sami al-Hajj

Al Jazeera cameraman Sami al-Hajj, a Sudanese national, was detained en route to Afghanistan in December 2001 and held without charge as an enemy combatant in Camp Delta of the Guantanamo Bay detention camp until May 2008. The reasons for his detention remain unknown, although the official US position on all detainees is that they are security threats. Reporters Without Borders repeatedly expressed concern about al-Hajj's detention, mentioning him in its annual Press Freedom Index and circulating a petition for his release.

Clive Stafford Smith, al-Hajj's lawyer, reported on 23 November 2005 that US officials had asked his client in 125 of 130 interviews if Al Jazeera was a front for al-Qaeda. After his release, al-Hajj expressed plans to sue US President George W. Bush for his treatment at Guantanamo. According to Stafford Smith, his accusations include beatings and sexual assault.

Al-Hajj was released on 1 May 2008 from Guantanamo Bay and flown to Sudan, arriving in Khartoum on a US military plane early on 2 May. Al Jazeera broadcast video in which he was carried into a hospital on a stretcher, looking frail but smiling and surrounded by well-wishers.

The Dark Side: Secrets of the Sports Dopers

Al Jazeera English and Al Jazeera America broadcast "The Dark Side: Secrets of the Sports Dopers", an episode of Al Jazeera Investigates examining professional athletes' possible use of performance-enhancing drugs (PEDs), on 27 December 2015. Peyton Manning and other prominent athletes were identified as having received drugs from Charles Sly, a pharmacist who had worked at the Guyer Anti-Aging Clinic in Indianapolis in the fall of 2011.

The Huffington Post leaked the episode a day before Al Jazeera's broadcast. In a Sunday NFL Countdown interview with ESPN's Lisa Salters on the morning of 27 December, Manning called the documentary "completely fabricated" and "garbage" and expressed anger about his wife was mentioned. When Salters noted that other athletes had first denied and then admitted allegations, Manning said that he could not speak for others. He said that he had visited the Guyer clinic 35 times in 2011 and received medication and treatment.

Sly recanted his story and requested that the report not be aired via a YouTube video. Although Sly later said that he had never seen the Mannings and told ESPN's Chris Mortensen that he is not a pharmacist and was not at the Guyer institute in 2011 (as Al Jazeera reported), state licensing records indicate that a Charles David Sly was licensed as a pharmacy intern in Indiana from April 2010 to 1 May 2013.

Manning hired former George W. Bush press secretary Ari Fleischer to manage the issue, and threatened to sue Al Jazeera. On 5 January 2016, it was announced that Ryan Howard and Ryan Zimmerman were suing Al Jazeera for defamation after the documentary aired. In January 2021 attorneys for Al Jazeera Media presented sealed evidence in court, which they said supported their original report.

The Lobby
Journalist Armin Rosen of the American Jewish magazine Tablet published an article on 20 January 2017 saying that pro-Palestinian filmmaker and undercover Al Jazeera reporter James Anthony Kleinfeld had infiltrated several pro-Israel advocacy organizations in Washington, D.C., including StandWithUs, the Israel Project, the Foundation for Defense of Democracies, the Israel on Campus Coalition, and the Zionist Organization of America's (ZOA) Fuel For Truth. According to the article, Kleinfeld had also infiltrated pro-Israel organizations and circles in the United Kingdom (the subject of an Al Jazeera documentary that month). As an undercover journalist, Kleinfield had reportedly obtained work at several pro-Israel organizations, interviewed dozens of Jewish pro-Israel activists, had access to donors, hosted Israeli embassy officials at his home, and filmed dozens of hours of video. Kleinfield left Washington suddenly in January 2017, around the time that Al Jazeera broadcast The Lobby: a four-part documentary series which used undercover journalism to infiltrate several pro-Israel advocacy groups in the United Kingdom.

On 11 October 2017, Al Jazeera admitted that it had installed an undercover journalist in several Washington-based pro-Israel organizations the previous year and was planning to air a documentary film based on the reporter's work. The announcement followed a ruling by the British media regulator Ofcom which rejected complaints about The Lobby; the documentary led to the resignation of an Israeli diplomat and sparked accusations of antisemitism from UK pro-Israel advocacy groups and representatives of the Jewish community. Clayton Swisher, Al Jazeera's director of investigative reporting, acknowledged that the network had stationed an undercover journalist in the UK and the US at the same time.

On 8 February 2018, it was reported that Qatari leaders had reassured the leaders of American Jewish organizations that Al Jazeera would not air its companion documentary series on the Israel lobby in the United States. According to Haaretz, the Qatari government had hired Republican Senator Ted Cruz's former aide Nicolas Muzin to open communications channels with Jewish American organizations. Al Jazeera had earlier sent letters to several American pro-Israel organizations informing them that their employees would appear in the documentary. The letters generated speculation that the Qatari government had reneged on its promise to prevent Al Jazeera from screening the documentary, which (like the British series) had used clandestine footage and recordings of pro-Israel activists.

Al Jazeera's decision not to screen the documentary was criticized by Swisher, who defended the investigation unit's use of undercover journalism, accused the organization of bowing to outside pressure, and took a sabbatical to express his displeasure. In March, a bipartisan group of US lawmakers which included Democratic Congressman Josh Gottheimer, Republican Congressman Lee Zeldin, and Ted Cruz wrote a letter urging United States Attorney General Jeff Sessions to investigate whether Al Jazeera should register as a foreign agent under the Foreign Agents Registration Act. They also urged the Justice Department to investigate reports that the organization had infiltrated nonprofit organizations and accused Al Jazeera of broadcasting "anti-American, anti-Semitic, and anti-Israel" content.

The Zionist Organization of America said on 10 April 2018 that Morton Klein, its president, lobbied the Qatari government not to screen the companion documentary series focusing on the American pro-Israel lobby. Portions of the series were leaked in late August and early September by several outlets, including the Electronic Intifada. The Electronic Intifada, French media outlet Orient XXI and Lebanon's Al Akhbar newspaper released the four episodes of The Lobby—USA in early November.

See also
 BBC controversies
 CBS News controversies and criticism
 CNN controversies
 Fox News controversies
 MSNBC controversies
 List of controversies involving The New York Times

References

Further reading
 

Al Jazeera
Television controversies
Political controversies in television
Journalism controversies by media organ